Xi Mingze (born 25 June 1992), nicknamed Xiao Muzi, is the only child of General Secretary of the Chinese Communist Party Xi Jinping and operatic-style traditional singer Peng Liyuan.

Early life and education
Xi Mingze was born on 25 June 1992 at Fuzhou Maternal and Child Health Care Hospital in Fuzhou. She is the only daughter of Xi Jinping and his wife Peng Liyuan. Xi keeps a low profile, and not much of her personal information has been revealed to the public. She studied French at her high school, Hangzhou Foreign Language School, from 2006 to 2008. Xi enrolled in Harvard University in the US in 2010, after a year of undergraduate study at Zhejiang University. She enrolled under a pseudonym and maintained a low profile. In 2014, she graduated from Harvard with a Bachelor of Arts degree in psychology and was thought to have returned to Beijing. In February 2022, US congresswoman Vicky Hartzler's press release revealed Xi had reenrolled for graduate studies in 2019 and is living in the US.

Public life
Following the 2008 Sichuan earthquake, Xi volunteered as a disaster relief worker for one week in Hanwang, Mianzhu. In 2013, she made her first public appearance with her parents at the Liangjiahe village in Yan'an, Shaanxi, where they offered Chinese New Year greetings to the locals. She has been described as interested in reading and fashion.

Controversies

Information leak
According to US state media outlet Radio Free Asia, in 2019, Niu Tengyu (牛騰宇) was arrested for allegedly leaking pictures of Xi Mingze's ID card on a website called esu.wiki. Human rights group China Change criticized the alleged use of torture and sleep deprivation to extract confessions from the suspects. Radio Free Asia reported that on 30 December 2020, the Maonan District People's Court sentenced Niu to 14 years in prison and a 130,000 RMB fine for "picking quarrels and stirring up trouble", "infringing on citizens' personal information", and "incitement of subversion of state power", while the 23 others were given lesser sentences.

References

External links

 Family Photographs

1992 births
Living people
Mingze
People from Fuzhou
Children of national leaders of China
Daughters of national leaders
Chinese expatriates in the United States
Harvard College alumni